Seyyedan (also Romanized as Seyyedān and Seydān; also known as Saīyīdeh) is a village in Khvor Khvoreh Rural District, in the Central District of Bijar County, Kurdistan Province, Iran. At the 2006 census, its population was 893, in 220 families. The village is populated by Kurds.

References 

Towns and villages in Bijar County
Kurdish settlements in Kurdistan Province